Ferdinando Pereira Leda (born 22 April 1980) is a Brazilian footballer. Mainly a defensive midfielder, he can also play as a left back.

Career 
Until 2005 Ferdinando played for Centro de Futebol Zico Sociedade Esportiva. Then he was transferred to Avaí. In 2007, he was loaned to Esporte Clube São Bento and in 2010 to Grêmio.

On 26 January 2012, it was announced that Ferdinando joined South Korean club Incheon United.

Honours
Portuguesa
Campeonato Brasileiro Série B: 2011
Campeonato Paulista Série A2: 2013

References

External links

1980 births
Living people
Sportspeople from Maranhão
Brazilian footballers
Association football midfielders
Palmas Futebol e Regatas players
Avaí FC players
Esporte Clube São Bento players
Grêmio Foot-Ball Porto Alegrense players
Associação Portuguesa de Desportos players
Incheon United FC players
Nacional Atlético Clube (SP) players
Novoperário Futebol Clube players
Rio Claro Futebol Clube players
K League 1 players
Júbilo Iwata players
J2 League players
Brazilian expatriate footballers
Brazilian expatriate sportspeople in South Korea
Expatriate footballers in South Korea
Brazilian expatriate sportspeople in Japan
Expatriate footballers in Japan